The Champions Soccer League USA (CSL USA) was an American men's soccer league. The league was sanctioned by the United States Adult Soccer Association (USASA). The league announced that after the 2017 season CSL USA would use promotion and relegation policies; however, the league did not survive long enough to implement this planned structure.

History

The CSL USA began in 2014 with the initial season beginning in 2015. St. Pete Raiders captured the first league title with an 8-1-1 record. The league began in Florida and has expanded to locations around the United States beginning with the Northeast region. 

On April 6, 2017 CSL USA was granted status as a USASA national league (clubs in all four regions, at least 32 member clubs located in a minimum of 12 different states) just the third league (NPSL, PDL) with this distinction. It is the first-ever national league to use promotion and relegation in US Soccer.

CSL USA did not have a 2018 season, and some teams from the league moved to the United Premier Soccer League.

Teams

Champions

References

External links 
CSL USA website
Soccer leagues in the United States
Soccer in Florida
2015 establishments in Florida